The Makar or National Poet for Scotland is the national poet laureate of Scotland. The current Makar is Kathleen Jamie, who was appointed in August 2021. Holders of the post are appointed by the Scottish Government and supported by the Scottish Poetry Library.

Role
The Makar's responsibilities include:

 taking a leadership role in promoting poetry nationally
 producing poems relating to significant national events
 encouraging the reading and writing of poetry, particularly by young people
 reading their poems publicly, at public events, and commenting publicly on poetry, the arts and any and all related matters in Scotland and internationally
 preparing a report on their experience in the role each year

The stipend for the post is £15,000 per year for 3 years, to recompense the Makar for their time in writing or attending events in this role. The post is appointed by the Scottish Government in an unregulated appointment. The Scottish Poetry Library provides support to the post including media handling, festival booking and web presence.

Appointment process
With the appointment of Kathleen Jamie in 2021, the Scottish Government convened an expert panel representing Scotland's literary sector to consider nominations for the next Makar and agree upon a recommendation to put to the First Minister. The panel members were:

 David Seers, Head of Sponsorship and Funding Team, Culture and Historic Environment Division, Scottish Government, (Chair)
 Alan Bett, Head of Literature and Publishing, Creative Scotland
 Jackie Cromarty, Associate Director of External Relations, National Library of Scotland
 Dr David Goldie, President, Association for Scottish Literary Studies
 Peggy Hughes, Chair, Literature Alliance Scotland
 Eleanor Livingstone, Former Festival Director, Stanza Poetry Festival
 Marjorie Lotfi, Poet, Director of Open Book and Chair of Board of Trustees, Wigtown Book Festival
 Dr Robyn Marsack, former Director of the Scottish Poetry Library
 Dr Peter Mackay, Lecturer in English, University of St Andrews and poet
 Michael Pedersen, Poet and Poetry Programmer, Neu!Reekie!

The term of the Makar is now 3 years, rather than the 5 years which it had previously been.

Makars
 Edwin Morgan (2004-2010)
 Liz Lochhead (2011-2016)
 Jackie Kay (2016-2021)
 Kathleen Jamie (2021–present)

See also
Makar

References